The James Rolph was a schooner that transported cargo around the United States West Coast and Hawaii. Built near Eureka, California in 1899, the ship was based in San Francisco and owned by its namesake, shipping executive and future Governor of California, James Rolph.

At 10 in the evening, the ship, blinded by the fog, sailed close to the shore, crashing into rocks at Point San Pedro in Pacifica, grounding 50 feet from the shoreline. The Rolph was grounded at the same spot where the four-masted bark Drumburton had been lost previously in 1904. The Rolph's crew managed to reach shore safely without any injuries or loss of life, yet the vessel could not be pulled off the rocks. Tug boats attempted to haul the Rolph free but to no avail.

The Rolph was later stripped of usable fittings by salvage crews and abandoned.

References

1899 ships
Ships built in California
Shipwrecks of the California coast
Maritime incidents in 1910